Ana Lucía de Teresa Romero (born 5 November 2001), often known as ADT, is a Spanish footballer who plays as a forward for Sporting de Huelva.

Club career
De Teresa started her career at Levante C.

References

External links
Profile at La Liga

2001 births
Living people
Women's association football forwards
Spanish women's footballers
Footballers from Ibiza
Levante UD Femenino players
Rayo Vallecano Femenino players
SD Eibar Femenino players
Primera División (women) players
Segunda Federación (women) players